Jack Hourigan (born August 14, 1968, in Burlington, Ontario, Canada) is a playwright, actress, and co-host of the show How to Boil Water on the Food Network with Tyler Florence. Prior to that experience, she was an original cast member of Second City Cleveland.

Filmography
 (2004) Christmas at Maxwell's
 (2003) American Splendor
 (2003) The Line of Masculinity
 (2010) Unnatural History

External links
 Bio on the Food Network
 

1968 births
American television personalities
Male television personalities
Actresses from Cleveland
Actresses from Ontario
Living people
People from Burlington, Ontario
21st-century American women